Kappil railway station station code KFI, is one of the four railway stations serving the Varkala urban agglomeration in Thiruvananthapuram district of Kerala. It is situated in Edava Panchayat of Varkala Taluk. It is the 20th most revenue-generating railway station in Trivandrum district.
Kappil Beach and lake is situated close to this railway station is one of the major tourist destinations in Trivandrum. In 2018–19 FY Kappil generated ₹1.18lakh profit from 15,529 passengers.

Railway stations in Thiruvananthapuram district